Al Amal (Arabic: The Hope) was an Arabic daily newspaper published in Tunisia. It existed between 1934 and 1988.

History and profile
Al Amal was established in 1934. The daily was the organ of the Neo Destour Party.

Al Amal had a sister publication, L'Action, a French daily. Both papers were headquartered in Tunis.

Al Amal folded in 1988 and was succeeded by Al Hurriya, another Arabic daily.

References

1934 establishments in Tunisia
1988 disestablishments in Tunisia
Arabic-language newspapers
Defunct newspapers published in Tunisia
Mass media in Tunis
Publications established in 1934
Publications disestablished in 1988
Former state media